Verkh-Nenya is a rural locality (a selo) and the administrative center of Verkh-Neninsky Selsoviet, Yeltsovsky District, Altai Krai, Russia. The population was 226 as of 2013. There are 11 streets.

Geography 
Verkh-Nenya is located 38 km southeast of Yeltsovka (the district's administrative centre) by road. Makaryevka is the nearest rural locality.

References 

Rural localities in Yeltsovsky District